Kamil Łaszczyk (born 20 January 1991) is a Polish professional boxer.

Łaszczyk is the Republic of Poland International Featherweight champion.

Professional boxing record

Professional MMA record

References

External links
 

Living people
1991 births
Polish male boxers
Sportspeople from Wrocław
Featherweight boxers